Peter Brogle (22 June 1933 – 27 March 2006) was a Swiss film actor. He appeared in 14 films between 1955 and 1987. He starred in the 1968 film Signs of Life by Werner Herzog, which won the Silver Bear Extraordinary Prize of the Jury at the 18th Berlin International Film Festival. In 1979, he won the Hans-Reinhart-Ring award.

Selected filmography
 Signs of Life (1968)
  (1976)

References

External links

1933 births
2006 deaths
Swiss male film actors
Swiss male television actors
20th-century Swiss male actors